Arsen Kasabiev born 15 November 1987 in Tskhinvali, South Ossetia) is a Polish-Georgian weightlifter of Ossetian origin. At the 2004 Summer Olympics he placed 14th. At the 2008 Summer Olympics he originally placed fourth, but due to the doping failure of Ilya Ilyin and Khadzhimurat Akkaev, he placed second. At the 2008 Summer Olympics in Beijing, PR China he initially gained attention for being from South Ossetia due to the 2008 South Ossetia war. He publicly announced that he no longer wanted to represent Georgia and moved to Poland afterwards.

He was granted Polish citizenship in December 2009; he now represents Poland.

He represented Poland at the 2012 Summer Olympics, in the event Weightlifting Men's 94 kg. He did not finish, owing to an injury.

References

External links 
 

1987 births
Living people
Polish male weightlifters
Male weightlifters from Georgia (country)
Olympic weightlifters of Poland
Olympic weightlifters of Georgia (country)
Weightlifters at the 2004 Summer Olympics
Weightlifters at the 2008 Summer Olympics
Weightlifters at the 2012 Summer Olympics
Naturalized citizens of Poland
Polish people of Ossetian descent
Georgian emigrants to Poland
European Weightlifting Championships medalists
Polish people of Georgian descent
Olympic medalists in weightlifting
Olympic silver medalists for Georgia (country)
Medalists at the 2008 Summer Olympics